Samanjac (Serbian Cyrillic: Самањац ) is a mountain in central Serbia, near the town of Boljevac. Its highest peak has an elevation of 853 meters above sea level.

References

Mountains of Serbia